Marlon Luiz Teixeira (born September 16, 1991) is a Brazilian fashion model.

Career
He started his career when his grandmother introduced him to Anderson Baumgartner, owner of Way Model Management and friend of the family.

He has walked for numerous shows including Chanel, Balmain, Emporio Armani, Dolce & Gabbana, DSquared², Roberto Cavalli, Jean Paul Gaultier and many more and opened for shows such as Emporio Armani and Dior Homme. Marlon has also appeared on several magazine covers L'Officiel Hommes, Essential Homme, Fiasco, Made in Brazil, Client, and Hercules. Alongside this he has appeared in high fashion editorials for GQ, Vogue Espana, V, Elle, W magazine with Ginnifer Goodwin and Vanity Fair with Shakira.

In 2011, Teixeira the became face of new Diesel fragrance "Diesel Fuel for Life Denim Collection" together with Dutch model Marloes Horst. The ad campaign was shot by Terry Richardson and video campaign is directed by Melina Matsoukas.

Formerly ranked in the Top 50 by models.com. He is currently ranked Trending Men, Top Icons Men, Sexiest Men, Next Generation on Models.com list of the international male models. 2015's Hottest Male Model by Yahoo.

He took part in Philip Kirkorov's video-clip, “Snow”.

Awards:

 Muzt TV Awards 2012 (Philipp Kirkorov - Snow)
 Portugal Fashion Awards 2012 (BEST NEW FACE MODEL: Marlon Teixeira)
 LIA Awards - Silver 2011 (Diesel Fuel for Life Denim Collection)
 Clio Awards - Bronze 2012 (Diesel Fuel for Life Denim Collection)

Personal life 
Teixeira is of  Portuguese,   Japanese and Indigenous descent. He lives in Praia Brava - Itajaí SC but he travels a lot. He lived in New York City.

References

Notes

External links 

1991 births
Living people
People from Santa Catarina (state)
Brazilian people of Portuguese descent
Brazilian people of Swiss descent
Brazilian people of Japanese descent
Brazilian people of indigenous peoples descent
Brazilian male models